Jonah Bokaer (born October 1, 1981) is an American choreographer and media artist. He works on live performances in the United States and elsewhere, including choreography, digital media, cross-disciplinary collaborations, and social enterprise.

Education
Originally from Ithaca, New York, Bokaer trained in dance at Cornell University, and subsequently graduated from University of North Carolina School of the Arts as a North Carolina Academic Scholar (Contemporary Dance/Performance, 2000). Recruited for the Merce Cunningham Dance Company at the unprecedented age of 18, Bokaer pursued a parallel degree in Visual & Media Studies at The New School (2003–2007), where he received the Joan Kirnsner Memorial Award. Additional studies in media and performance occurred at Parsons The New School for Design, NYU Performance Studies, and through self-taught explorations into digital media and 3D animation: such studies led to the development of a rare, multi-disciplinary approach to choreography, addressing the human body in relation to contemporary technologies.

Dance and choreography
As a dancer, Bokaer has worked with Merce Cunningham (2000–2007), John Jasperse (2004–2005), David Gordon (2005–2006), Deborah Hay (2005), Tino Sehgal (2008), and many others. He has also interpreted the choreography of George Balanchine as restaged by Melissa Hayden. Bokaer is also a frequent choreographer for Robert Wilson (2007–Present).

Bokaer is the author of 30 original choreographies, produced in Belgium, Canada, Cuba, Denmark, France, Germany, Greece, Holland, India, Spain, Switzerland, Thailand, the United Kingdom, and the United States. Recent engagements include the Attakalari Performance Biennale (Bangalore 2009), the Rotterdamse Schouwburg (Holland 2010), Jacob's Pillow Dance Festival (Becket, MA 2011), Festival d'Avignon (Avignon, 2012), BAM Next Wave Festival, and a commission from the National Academy of Sciences (Washington, D.C.).

Activism and social enterprise
Under the leadership Bokaer in 2002, a group of artists and choreographers formed Chez Bushwick, an adventurous arts organization that has significantly impacted a new generation of dance artists, choreographers, and performers in the United States, and beyond. Founding artists developed a series of public programs that have become emblematic of a new way of working in New York City: across borders, across disciplines, employing variable aesthetic signatures, and overturning divisions between choreographer, curator, producer, and audience member. Through strategies of collaboration, activism, and public dialogue, these cultural strategies have achieved economic justice during a challenging real estate and funding climate in NYC. Chez Bushwick was recently awarded by the Rockefeller Foundation NYC Cultural Innovation Fund.

Bokaer is a co-founder of the Center for Performance Research (CPR), a nonprofit organization in collaboration with John Jasperse/Thin Man Dance. CPR's L.E.E.D.-certified green building, the first in Brooklyn, provides affordable space for rehearsal and performance, arts programming, education and engagement with the community.

Writing
Bokaer's writings have been published in Artwurl, The American Society for Alexander Teachers, Critical Correspondence, AADIAL Magazine, Goldrush Dance Magazine, ITCH, Movement Research Performance Journal, and NYFA Current.

Selected works

ECLIPSE 
The Ulysses Syndrome 
Fifth Wall
OCCUPANT (Movements I-IV)
Mass.Mobile
FILTER
Reverse Ruin

On Vanishing
Why Patterns
SEQUEL
RECESS
REPLICA
STACKS
Anchises

Autograph
Prayer & Player
The Invention Of Minus One
Three Cases Of Amnesia
A Cure For Surveillance
No Caption
False Start

| underscore |
underscribble
CHARADE
Relative
NUDEDESCENDANCE
RSVP
OCTAVE

Collaborations
 Daniel Arsham | Artist (2009–Present)
 Charles Atlas | Filmmaker (2003)
 Irit Batsry   | Video Artist (2010)
 Liubo Borissov | Surveillance Designer (2007)
 Anne Carson | Writer (2008)
 Michael Cole | Video Artist (2006–2008)
 Peter Cole | Sculptor (2008)
 Collective Opera Company | Original Opera (2006)
 Aaron Copp | Lighting Designer (2008–Present)
 Merce Cunningham | Choreographer (2000–2007)
 Loren Dempster | Composer (2005–Present)
 Robert Gober | Sculptor (2005)
 Marisela La Grave | Intermedia Events (2003)
 Christian Marclay | Composer (2008)
 Isaac Mizrahi | Fashion Designer (2008)
 Snarkitecture | Scenographers (2010)
 Robert Wilson | Theater Artist (2007–Present)
 FAUST, By Charles Gounod (Teatr Wielki, Polish National Opera, 2008)
 AÏDA, By Giuseppe Verdi (Teatro dell'Opera di Roma, Italy, 2009)
 KOOL: Suzushi Hanayagi (Guggenhiem Museum, New York City, 2009)
 CONFINES (IVAM: Institut Valencià d'Art Modern, Spain, 2009)
 Dialogue ONE Theatre Festival, Williamstown, MA, 2009

Museums, performances and commissions
The Solomon R. Guggenheim Museum / Works & Process Series 2010 - New York, USA
The Solomon R. Guggenheim Museum / Choreography in the Rotunda, 2011 - New York, USA
The New Museum - New York, USA
MoMA PS1 - New York, USA
The Museum of Arts & Design - New York, USA
The Whitney Museum of American Art - New York, USA
Museum of Contemporary Art, North Miami - Miami, USA
MASS MoCA North Adams - MA, USA
Le Carré d'Art - Nîmes, France
MAC Marseille - Marseille, France
La Ferme du Buisson - Marne-La-Vallée, France
Kunsthalle St. Gallen - St. Gallen, Switzerland
Institut Valencià d'Art Modern - IVAM - Valencia, Spain
Palazzo deli Arti - Napoli, Italy
MUDAM - Luxembourg

Relations with France

Bokaer's choreography over the past decade has been made possible in large part through a vigorous artistic relationship with France.
 
Dance and choreography
 Working with the Merce Cunningham Dance Company throughout 30 French cities, in 9 regions, over the course of 8 years
 Touring new choreography to Alternative Spaces in Paris - Naxos Bobine (2006), La Générale (2006), Atelier de Paris (2007), Galerie Emmanuel Perrotin (2007, 2010)
 Production support in Marseille - La Compagnie (2006), Ballet National de Marseille (2010), MAC Marseille (2010)
 Production support in Lyon - Les  (2007)
 Production support in Nîmes - Le Carré d'Art (2009)
 Production support in Paris - Art/Dan/Thé Festival, Vanves (2010)
 Production support in Avignon - Les Hivernales Festival (2011), Les Penitents Blancs (2011), CDC Avignon (2011)
 Receipt of the FUSED / French U.S. Exchange in Dance grant (2011)
 
Production and presentation
 Provision of residencies to Alexandre Roccoli (Chez Bushwick, 2007)
 Provision of residencies to Christian Rizzo (CPR, 2008)
 Provision of residencies to Steven Cohen (CPR, 2009)
 Provision of residencies to David Wampach (CPR, 2009)
 Restaging of French choreography on U.S. artists via David Wampach (CPR, 2009)

Leadership
 Induction into Young Leaders of the French American Foundation 2008 (Paris, Strasbourg) / 2009 (Chicago)

Partnerships
 FUSED / French U.S. Exchange in Dance (2007, 2008, 2010, 2011)
 Cultural Services of the French Embassy (2008, 2009, 2010)
 FIAF's Crossing The Line Festival (2007, 2008, 2009)
 ONDA (2010)

Awards and honors
Bokaer has been honored with a Human Rights Award (Public Volunteerism, 2000), a fellowship from the Foundation for Contemporary Arts (Dance & Media, 2005–2006), the inaugural Gallery Installation Fellowship from Dance Theater Workshop (2007), and one of four national Dance Access Scholarships from Dance/USA, with funds from the Andrew W. Mellon Foundation (2007), and the Alumni Achievement Award from the University of North Carolina School of the Arts (2009). Additionally, Bokaer recently accepted the Special Citation at the New York Dance & Performance / Bessie Awards, for the arts organization Chez Bushwick (2007); his choreography "The Invention Of Minus One" was also awarded a Bessie Award for original lighting design by Aaron Copp (2008). He is also a 2008–2009 Young Leader of the French American Foundation, and is the first dance artist to have been awarded.

Awards, honors, fellowships 
 Human Rights Award (Public Service, 2000)
 Joan Kirnsner Memorial Award (The New School, 2005)
 Foundation for Contemporary Arts Grants to Artists Award (2005–2006)
 Passing It On Award, Brooklyn Arts Exchange (Chez Bushwick, 2006)
 25 To Watch, Dance Magazine (2006)
 Inaugural Gallery Installation Fellowship from Dance Theater Workshop (Media, 2007)
 Rolex Mentor and Protégé Arts Initiative in Dance (Dance Finalist, 2007)
 New York Dance and Performance / Bessie Award - Special Citation (Chez Bushwick, 2007)
 New York Dance and Performance / Bessie Award - (Lighting Design by Aaron Copp, 2008)
 National Dance Access Scholarship from Dance/USA (via Mellon Foundation, 2007)
 Young Leader of the French American Foundation (First Choreographer Awarded, 2008–2009)
 Alumni Achievement Award from University of North Carolina School of the Arts (2009)
 OUT Magazine (2009)
 Rockefeller Foundation NYC Cultural Innovation Award (Chez Bushwick, Youngest Recipient, 2009–2010)
 The Nifty Fifty, America's Up-And-Coming Talent (NY Times, 2010)
 Crain's NY Business "40 Under 40" (2011)
 Bogliasco Foundation / Jerome Robbins Special Fellowship in Choreography (Italy, 2011)
 Prix Nouveau Talent Chorégraphie, Société des Auteurs et Compositeurs Dramatiques (Paris, 2011)
 National Endowment for the Arts (2011, 2012, 2013)
 John Simon Guggenheim Fellowship, (New York, 2015) 
 United States Artists Fellowship, (New York, 2015)

References
Notes

Further reading

 2wice Arts Foundation, Cunningham and Rauschenberg. New York: Editions 2wice, 2005.
 2wice Arts Foundation, False Start: Jonah Bokaer. New York: Editions 2wice, 2008.
 2wice Arts Foundation, Fifth Wall: Jonah Bokaer. New York: Editions 2wice, 2012.
 2wice Arts Foundation, Green World: Merce Cunningham. New York: Editions 2wice, 2007.
 BAM: The Brooklyn Academy of Music, BAM: The Complete Works. New York: The Quantuck Lane Press, 2011.
 Baryshnikov, Mikhail, Merce My Way. New York: The Baryshnikov Foundation, 2008.
 Boisseau, Rosita and Philippe, Laurent, Photographier La Danse. Paris: Nouvelles Éditions Scala, 2013.
 Copeland, Roger, Merce Cunningham: The Modernizing of Modern Dance. New York: Routledge, 2004.
 DeMers, Anna Sycamore, "On the Beach by Jonah Bokaer and Davide Balliano". The Johns Hopkins University Press: Theatre Journal, Vol. 65, No. 1., pp. 101–102 (March 2013). DOI: 10.1353/tj.2013.0017
 England, Betsy, Gray Matter: Daniel Arsham, Jonah Bokaer, and Judith Sánchez Ruíz's REPLICA. The Drama Review: Vol. 55, No. 1. (Spring, 2011).
 Foundation for Contemporary Arts, Artists for Artists: Fifty Years of the Foundation for Contemporary Arts. New York: Foundation for Contemporary Arts, 2013.
 Galerie Emmanuel Perrotin, Daniel Arsham. Paris, Miami: Galerie Emmanuel Perrotin, 2008.
 Galerie Emmanuel Perrotin, Daniel Arsham. New York, Paris, Hong-Kong: Galerie Emmanuel Perrotin, 2012.
 Gober, Robert, A Robert Gober Lexicon, Essay By Brenda Richardson. New York: Matthew Marks Gallery, 2005.
 Jacobson, Bill, Photographs. Ostfildern, Germany: Hatje Cantz Verlag, 2005.
 Lithgow, John, Drama: An Actor's Education. New York: Harper Collins: 2011.
 Milder, Patricia, Performing Arts Journal #100: Performance New York. Cambridge, MA: MIT Press Journals, 2012.
 Reynolds, Dee, Rhythmic Subjects: Uses of Energy in the Dances of Mary Wigman, Martha Graham and Merce Cunningham. Alton, England: Dance Books, 2007.
 Turk, Edward Baron, "Avignon 2012: Celebrating the Jean Vilar Centennial". The French Review, Vol. 87, No. 1. (October 2013)
 Wozny, Nancy, Jonah Bokaer: Moving Toward An Embodied Technology. Contact Quarterly: CQ Chapbook 1, newDANCEmedia. Vol. 35, No. 2.  (Summer, 2010).
 On Vanishing: "New Mythologies for Choreography in the Museum, Jonah Bokaer". PAJ: A Journal of Performance and Art (May 2014), Vol. 36, No. 2, pp. 10–13 (doi: 10.1162/PAJJ_a_00190)

External links
 
 Archival footage of Jonah Bokaer performing in Why Patterns in 2011 at Jacob's Pillow. 
 Archival footage of Jonah Bokaer performing in Curtain in 2012 at Jacob's Pillow. 
 Archival footage of Jonah Bokaer's work Rules of The Game in 2017 at Jacob's Pillow. 
 Chez Bushwick
 Center for Performance Research
 Daniel Arsham
 Robert Wilson
 Snarkitecture

1981 births
Living people
Artists from Ithaca, New York
Cornell University alumni
University of North Carolina School of the Arts alumni
American choreographers
The New School alumni